5370 Taranis, provisional designation , is an asteroid and suspected dormant comet on an eccentric orbit, classified as near-Earth object of the Amor group, approximately 5 kilometers in diameter.

Description 

Taranis was discovered on 2 September 1986, by French astronomer Alain Maury at the Palomar Observatory in California, United States. It is one of very few asteroids located in the 2:1 mean-motion resonance with Jupiter. When at aphelion of 5.4 AU, the object is roughly the same distance from the Sun as Jupiter is when Jupiter is at aphelion. The unstable resonance with Jupiter is expected to last roughly 7.3 million years.

Taranis also is expected of being a dormant comet. On 10 September 2099 it will pass  from Earth.

This minor planet was named after the Gaulish god of thunder Taranis from Celtic mythology. The official naming citation was published by the Minor Planet Center on 1 September 1993.

References

External links 
 (5370) Taranis at AstDyS-2
 Asteroid Lightcurve Database (LCDB), query form (info )
 Dictionary of Minor Planet Names, Google books
 
 
 

005370
Discoveries by Alain Maury
Named minor planets
19860902